Matignon may refer to:

 Hôtel Matignon in Paris, France, the official residence of the French Prime Minister 
 Matignon, Côtes-d'Armor, a commune of the Côtes-d'Armor département in France
 Matignon High School, a Catholic school in Cambridge, Massachusetts, USA
 Matignon (cuisine), a mirepoix in which the ingredients are minced rather than diced and more flavourings added
 Matignon (surname), a French surname
 Matignon Accords (1936)
 Matignon Agreements (1988)

See also
 Matignon Agreements (disambiguation)